Live at Bearsville Theater is a live album and DVD release from Dar Williams.  It is her second live album, after 2001's Out There Live.

Track listing
All songs are by Dar Williams, except for "Ripple" (a cover version of a song by the Grateful Dead from their 1970 album American Beauty).
"When I Was a Boy" 
"The Ocean"
"The One Who Knows"
"The Christians and the Pagans"
"February"
"Iowa"
"The Babysitter's Here"
"As Cool as I Am"
"Spring Street"
"If I Wrote You"
"Mercy of the Fallen"
"Are You Out There"
"The Beauty of the Rain"
"The Easy Way"
"After All"
"Ripple" (Garcia, Hunter)

Dar Williams albums
2007 live albums
Live video albums
2007 video albums
Razor & Tie live albums
Razor & Tie video albums